Gábor Balla (born 23 December 1941) is a Hungarian former sports shooter. He competed in the 25 metre pistol event at the 1964 Summer Olympics.

References

1941 births
Living people
Hungarian male sport shooters
Olympic shooters of Hungary
Shooters at the 1964 Summer Olympics
Sport shooters from Budapest